Dana Berger (born 2 November 1970) is an Israeli singer-songwriter and occasional actress. She is also a graduate of the Rimon School of Jazz and Contemporary Music. Berger came to fame in the 1990s, appearing on the popular TV show Inyan Shel Zman. After becoming well known, she released a number of albums, which among them is the widely popular album Ad Ha'Katze (To the Edge), which was certified platinum and went on to sell over 60,000 copies in Israel.

Discography
"Gan Eden Ironi" (with Balagan) – 1992
"Dana Berger" – 1994
"Pashoot Lehiot" – 1999
"Ad Ha'Katze" – 2000
"Toch Ke'Dei Tenuah" – 2003
"Yom Yom" – 2006
"Hinei Ba'ati HaBaita" (with Itay Pearl) – 2010

External links
 

1970 births
Living people
20th-century Israeli women singers
Israeli pop singers
Israeli rock singers
Israeli film actresses
Israeli television actresses
Jewish Israeli musicians
Open University of Israel alumni
Survivor (Israeli TV series) contestants
21st-century Israeli women singers